My Old Ways may refer to:
"My Old Ways", a song by Dr. Dog from the album We All Belong, 2007
"My Old Ways", a song by the Plot in You from the album Happiness in Self Destruction, 2015
"My Old Ways", a song by Status Quo from the album Quid Pro Quo, 2011